Man Without Memory is a 1984 Swiss drama film directed by Kurt Gloor. It was entered into the 34th Berlin International Film Festival.

Cast
  as the man without memory
 Lisi Mangold as Lisa Brunner
 Hannelore Elsner as Dr. Essner
 Siegfried Kernen as Dr. Huber
 Esther Christinat as Schwester Mehret
  as Pfleger Jonas
 Rudolf Bissegger as Dr. Schellbert
 Rüdiger Vogler

References

External links

1984 films
1984 drama films
Swiss drama films
1980s German-language films
Films directed by Kurt Gloor
Films about amnesia
Films about psychiatry